

Places

United States
Grady, Alabama, an unincorporated community
Grady, Arkansas, a city
Grady, Mississippi, an unincorporated community
Grady, New Mexico, a village
Grady, Oklahoma, an unincorporated community
Grady, Virginia, an unincorporated community
Grady County, Georgia
Grady County, Oklahoma

Poland
Grądy (disambiguation)

People and fictional characters
Grady (given name)
Grady (surname)

Arts and entertainment
Grady (band), an American cowboy metal band
Grady (British TV series), a 1970 British television series
Grady (American TV series), a 1975 American television comedy series that is a spinoff of Sanford and Son

Other uses
Grady Gang, a criminal group led by John D. Grady in New York in the 1860s
Grady Memorial Hospital, Atlanta, Georgia
Grady Memorial Hospital (Ohio), Delaware, Ohio